Tsunehiko is a masculine Japanese given name.

Possible writings
Tsunehiko can be written using different combinations of kanji characters. Here are some examples:

常彦, "usual, elegant boy"
常比古, "usual, young man (archaic)"
恒彦, "always, elegant boy"
恒比古, "always, young man (archaic)"
庸彦, "common, elegant boy"
毎彦, "every, elegant boy"

The name can also be written in hiragana つねひこ or katakana ツネヒコ.

Notable people with the name
, Japanese singer
, Japanese actor

Japanese masculine given names